Yolanda Jones (born 6 March 1984) is a Puerto Rican basketball player for Gigantes de Carolina and the Puerto Rican national team.

She participated at the 2018 FIBA Women's Basketball World Cup. Jones played JUCO ball at Trinity Valley Community College.

Louisiana statistics

Source

References

External links

1984 births
Living people
Puerto Rican expatriate basketball people in Finland
Puerto Rican expatriate basketball people in Germany
Louisiana Ragin' Cajuns women's basketball players
Power forwards (basketball)
People from Lumberton, North Carolina
Puerto Rican women's basketball players
Basketball players at the 2011 Pan American Games
Pan American Games gold medalists for Puerto Rico
Pan American Games medalists in basketball
Medalists at the 2011 Pan American Games